Silverado High School is a continuation high school in Mission Viejo, California, United States. It is part of the Saddleback Valley Unified School District.

References

External links
 Official school site

High schools in Orange County, California
Continuation high schools in California
Public high schools in California
Mission Viejo, California